David Malangi (192719 June 1999) was an Indigenous Australian Yolngu artist from the Northern Territory. He was one of the most well known bark painters from Arnhem Land and a significant figure in contemporary Indigenous Australian art. He was born at Mulanga, on the east bank of the Glyde River.

He painted on clear, red ochre or black backgrounds. He used much broader and bolder brushstrokes than other Arnhem Land bark painters. His work includes depictions of the sea eagle, crow, snake and goanna.

Malangi represented Australia at the São Paulo Art Biennial in 1983. He was one of the first Aboriginal artists whose work was featured in the Biennale of Sydney in 1979. In 1983 his work was exhibited at the Australian Perspecta at the Art Gallery of New South Wales, Sydney. He contributed ten hollow logs for the Aboriginal Memorial at the National Gallery of Australia in 1988. He travelled to New York City in 1988 as part of the Dreamings exhibition of Aboriginal art. In July 2004 an exhibition opened of David Malangi's work at the National Gallery of Australia called No Ordinary Place.

Australian one dollar note

The reproduction of one of his designs appeared on the reverse of the Australian one dollar note in 1966. This was done originally without his knowledge, acknowledged in 1967 with the release of the Australian one dollar note, he was later financially compensated after intervention by the Governor of the Reserve Bank, Dr H. C. Coombs, as well as receiving a specially struck medal. The image depicts the mortuary feast of the ancestral hunter Gurrmirringu.

The payment by the Reserve Bank to Malangi began issues of Aboriginal copyright in Australia.

Collections
 National Gallery of Australia, Canberra
 National Gallery of Victoria, Melbourne
 Kluge-Ruhe Aboriginal Art Collection, University of Virginia, Charlottesville
 Broken Hill Regional Art Gallery, Broken Hill, New South Wales
 Museum of Contemporary Art Australia, Sydney

References

External links 
 David Malangi at the Art Gallery of New South Wales
 'Dollar Dave’ and the Reserve Bank: a tale of art, theft and human rights by Stephen Gray – published 2016

1927 births
1999 deaths
Australian Aboriginal artists
People from the Northern Territory
Yolngu people